The Grande Prêmio do Cinema Brasileiro, more popularly known as Grande Otelo, is a Brazilian film award. It was established in 2000 as Grande Prêmio Cinema Brasil by the Ministry of Culture of Brazil that presented it in 2000 and 2001. In 2002, the newly established Academia Brasileira de Cinema taken on the role of delivering the award which was renamed to Grande Prêmio do Cinema Brasileiro. Sponsored by BR Distribuidora the 2002 edition had a "BR" on its name; in 2003, however, there was no sponsor. In 2004, it gained "TAM" on its name since TAM Airlines became the award sponsor. From 2008 to 2009 its sponsorship was provided by Vivo. From 2010 onward it has no company sponsoring it.

Awards categories 
The awards given include:
 Best Film
 Best Director
 Best Actor
 Best Supporting Actor
 Best Actress
 Best Supporting Actress
 Best Foreign Film
 Best Original Screenplay
 Best Adapted Screenplay
 Best Cinematography
 Best Editing
 Best Production Design
 Best Costume Design
 Best Score
 Best Sound
 Best Documentary
 Best Make-Up
 Best Short Film

See also
1st Grande Prêmio Cinema Brasil
2nd Grande Prêmio Cinema Brasil

References

External links
 Official site 

2000 establishments in Brazil
Awards established in 2000
Brazilian film awards